Yang Jianhua (b. 1955) is a Chinese archaeologist. She held the position of Professor of Archaeology at Jilin University from 1996 and is known as one of the first Mainland Chinese scholars to research world archaeology, including Mesopotamia and Siberia.

Education
Yang completed her undergraduate degree in archaeology at Jilin University in 1978 after which she remained at the university to teach. She completed her PhD in 2001 on the transformation from an agricultural to nomadic pastoralist economy in China's Northern Zone during the mid- to late 1st millennium BCE. While earlier 
studies referred to this period generically as Eastern Zhou, Yang created a detailed periodisation for the different regions spanning Hebei, Inner Mongolia, Gansu, and Ningxia provinces. Her thesis was published in 2004.

Career
After completing her undergraduate degree in 1978, Yang taught archaeology at Jilin University. She became associate professor in 1991 and full professor in 1996. Yang was a visiting scholar at the University of Cambridge in 1993 and 2002, as well as at the University of Pittsburgh in 2007.

In 2018, Yang and co-authors Shao Huiqiu and Pan Ling received the Golden Tripod Award of the Society for Chinese Archaeology for their book The Metal Road of the Eastern Eurasian Steppe. The English translation was published in 2020.

Yang was a member of the State Council's 7th Academic Consultative Committee for archaeology. She has been a committee member for the Research Centre for Foreign Archaeology of the Chinese Academy of Social Sciences since 2017.</ref=shao>

Selected publications

Chinese

English

Notes

References

External links
Yang Jianhua at Jilin University

1955 births
Living people
Place of birth missing (living people)
Jilin University alumni
Academic staff of Jilin University
Chinese archaeologists
Chinese women archaeologists
Archaeologists of the Near East
Prehistorians